Genaro Neyra (born 8 October 1952) is a Peruvian footballer. He played in two matches for the Peru national football team in 1983. He was also part of Peru's squad for the 1983 Copa América tournament.

References

1952 births
Living people
Peruvian footballers
Peru international footballers
Association football midfielders
People from Camaná Province